André Vltchek (December 29, 1963 – September 22, 2020) was a Soviet-born American political analyst, journalist, and a filmmaker. Vltchek was born in Leningrad but later became a naturalized U.S. citizen after being granted asylum there in his 20s. He lived in the United States, Chile, Peru, Mexico, Vietnam, Samoa, and Indonesia.

Vltchek covered armed conflicts in Peru, Kashmir, Mexico, Bosnia, Sri Lanka, Congo, India, South Africa, East Timor, Indonesia, Turkey, and the Middle East. He traveled to more than 140 countries, and wrote articles for Der Spiegel, Japanese newspaper The Asahi Shimbun, The Guardian, ABC News and the Czech Republic daily Lidové noviny. From 2004, Vltchek served as a senior fellow at the Oakland Institute.

He appeared on television and radio shows, including those broadcast by France 24, China Radio International, the Voice of Russia, CCTV, Ulusal Kanal (Turkey), Al Mayadeen (Pan-Arabic network), Radio Pacifika, Radio Cape, among others. Vltchek was interviewed by publications including the People's Daily, China Daily and the Tehran Times.

Commenting on Vltchek's book Oceania, published in 2010, American linguist Noam Chomsky said that it evoked "the reality of the contemporary world" and that "He has also not failed to trace the painful — and particularly for the West, shameful realities to their historical roots".

Biography
André Vltchek was born on December 29, 1963, in Leningrad (present-day Saint Petersburg), Soviet Union. His father was a Czech nuclear physicist and his mother a Russo-Chinese painter. He was raised in Plzeň, Czechoslovakia before emigrating to the United States. Until his death, he was based in Asia and Africa.

On September 22, 2020, he died, seemingly in his sleep, whilst being chauffeured in his car in Istanbul, Turkey. While his death was initially deemed suspicious by the police, his wife later confirmed that he had been unwell and died from complications related to diabetes.

Documentaries
In 2004, he produced and directed a documentary film about the Indonesian mass killings of 1965–66, Terlena – Breaking of The Nation. Right after a devastating earthquake that shook Chile in February 2010, Vltchek travelled to Chile and produced a documentary titled Chile Between Two Earthquakes.

For UNESCO, Vltchek wrote and directed a film Tumaini about social collapse and devastation caused by HIV pandemic in communities around Lake Victoria in Kenya. In 2012, he wrote and directed the documentary One Flew Over Dadaab to depict the 20-year long tragedy of Somali refugees in the largest refugee camps in the world (Dadaab, in Northern Kenya).

In 2013, Vltchek produced and directed the documentary film Rwanda Gambit, broadcast by Press TV. It aims at reversing the official narrative on the 1994 Rwandan genocide, exposing the Rwandan and Ugandan plunder of the Democratic Republic of the Congo on behalf of Western imperialism.

In March 2019, Vltchek was the keynote speaker for the "No to NATO and War — Yes to Peace and Progress" meeting and rally, held in Regina, Saskatchewan, Canada, and interviewed on Regina Community Radio.

Publications

Non-fiction and investigative journalism

 
 
 
 
 
 
  — about the rise of Western imperialism
  — a discussion on Western power and propaganda with Noam Chomsky
  — an in-depth analysis of the entire Pacific region and its "destruction" by traditional and neocolonial powers
  — about post–1965 Indonesia, a collapsed state
  — conversations with the Southeast Asian writer Pramoedya Ananta Toer

Fiction 
Vltchek was the author of several fictional novels and plays.
 
 
 
 
 Nalezený, a novel published in Czech

References

External links
 Vltchek's World in Words and Images

  What a wealth of treasures André Vltchek left to the world's left by Ramin Mazaheri on The Greanville Post

1963 births
2020 deaths
20th-century American dramatists and playwrights
21st-century American journalists
21st-century American non-fiction writers
21st-century American novelists
American investigative journalists
American male dramatists and playwrights
American male journalists
American male non-fiction writers
American male novelists
American people of Chinese descent
American people of Czech descent
American people of Russian descent
American photographers
Communist writers
Naturalized citizens of the United States
Writers from Saint Petersburg
20th-century American male writers
21st-century American male writers